South Sydney was an electoral district for the Legislative Assembly in the Australian state of New South Wales from 1880 to 1894, covering the southern part of the current Sydney central business district, Haymarket, Surry Hills, Moore Park and Chippendale, bordered by George Street, Broadway, City Road, Cleveland Street, South Dowling Street, Dacey Avenue, the western edge of Centennial Park, Moore Park Road, South Dowling Street, Oxford Street and Liverpool Street. It elected four members simultaneously, with voters casting four votes and the first four candidates being elected. For the 1894 election, it was replaced by the single-member electorates of Sydney-Phillip, Sydney-Belmore, Sydney-Flinders and Sydney-Cook.

Elections for the district were held in the general elections of 1880, 1882, 1885, 1887, 1889, and 1891. There was also a by-election in 1887 as a result of Bernhard Wise accepting the office of Attorney-General in the fourth Parkes government.

Members for South Sydney

Election results

References

Former electoral districts of New South Wales
1880 establishments in Australia
Constituencies established in 1880
1894 disestablishments in Australia
Constituencies disestablished in 1894